Lawn bowls Men's pairs B6–8 at the 2022 Commonwealth Games was held at the Victoria Park   from July 29 to August 2. A total of 12 athletes from 6 associations participated in the event.

Sectional play
The top four advance to the knockout stage.

Knockout stage

External links
Results

References

Men's pairs B6-8